<noinclude>

"Copycat" is a song recorded by American singer Billie Eilish. It was released by Darkroom and Interscope Records as the fourth single from Eilish's debut studio EP, Don't Smile at Me (2017). Eilish and her brother, Finneas O'Connell, co-wrote the song, with the latter solely handling the production. Musically an electronica and pop track with a hip hop-influenced instrumentation, the song was heavily inspired by someone who kept on copying Eilish and what she did.

Commercially, "Copycat" peaked at number 12 on the Billboard Bubbling Under Hot 100 chart and number 100 on the Canadian Hot 100. It has also received several certifications, notably a double platinum award from the Mexican Association of Producers of Phonograms and Videograms, A.C. (AMPROFON). The song was performed live during Eilish's 2019 When We All Fall Asleep Tour and her Where Do We Go? World Tour in 2020. A Sofi Tukker remix was released on January 12, 2018.

Background and release
"Copycat" was released on July 14, 2017, as the fourth single on Eilish's debut EP Don't Smile at Me. "Copycat" was written by the singer and Finneas O'Connell, her brother and the track's sole producer. Mastering and mixing was handled by the studio personnel, John Greenham, and Rob Kinelski, respectively. In an interview with Genius, Eilish mentioned that she wrote the song with her brother about a girl who copies everything that she does. "I write with my brother mostly. That song, we were just in his room, and I was like, 'Yo! There's this fucking girl and she keeps doing everything that I do. And I want to write about it.' Because it was in my mind." A remix by Sofi Tukker was released on January 12, 2018. Dan Regan of Billboard praised the remix, saying its tone "beefs up [Copycat] with a club-ready rhythm", and has a "flush of colors in its disco cheeks as new layers of synthetic brightness come in waves."

Music and lyrics
"Copycat" has been described as a hip-hop-influenced electronica and pop track in press reviews. According to sheet music published at Musicnotes.com, "Copycat" has a slow and constant tempo of 64 beats per minute (BPM) and is played in the key of E minor. Eilish's vocals span a range of E3 to G5. It features a minimalist production consisting of a bass guitar and piano. Titiana Crisano of Billboard compared the instrumentation to the later work of XXXTentacion and Tyler, the Creator. In an interview with Billboard, Eilish stated that Finneas came up with the "weird, creepy bass sound" and she thought it was cool.

The song is Eilish's response to someone who kept copying everything she is doing: "Copycat trying to cop my manner/Watch your back when you can’t watch mine/Copycat trying to cop my glamour/Why so sad, bunny, you can’t have mine?" As the song reaches the bridge, the instrumentation turns into a piano ballad and Eilish's vocals become somewhat quiet and build into a falsetto and apologizes as she warns the person that they have reached their limit: "You just crossed the line/You've run out of time/I'm so sorry, now you know/Sorry I'm the one that told you so." She then tricks the listener with "psyche" and returns to the original dark lyrics.

Reception and live performances
Insider Libby Torres, called the track a "precursor of sorts to 'Bad Guy'" and felt that "Copycat" lacks the "driving bass and increasingly-layered vocals" that made "Bad Guy" a good song. However, Torres concedes it is still a "worthy song that provides a tantalizing glimpse of Eilish's early potential". NME Thomas Smith commented that "Copycat" was "impossibly swagger" with "scattered beats and energetic live performances making it a welcome entry point for many fans." Niall Byrne of The Irish Times described the ending as a "menacing synth" that  reappears to "underscore her sullen demeanour". Kirsten Spruch of Billboard described the track as a "ground-shaking opener". Mike Wass writing for Idolator labeled "Copycat" as a "raised middle-finger to all the fakes and frauds". Katherine Cusumano of W magazine cited the track as a "don't-eff-with-me opening statement".

"Copycat" did not enter the Billboard Hot 100, however, it peaked at number 12 on the Bubbling Under Hot 100 chart. The song also peaked at number 100 on the Canadian Hot 100. "Copycat" has been awarded notably a double platinum certification award from the Mexican Association of Producers of Phonograms and Videograms, A.C. (AMPROFON). Eilish performed "Copycat" at the Coachella Valley Music and Arts Festival in April, at the Glastonbury Festival in June, and at Pukkelpop in August 2019. "Copycat" was included on the setlist of Eilish's 2019 When We All Fall Asleep Tour, and on her 2020 Where Do We Go? World Tour. A fraction of song was interpolated during a performance of "Oxytocin" during Happier Than Ever, The World Tour (2022).

Track listing
Digital download / streaming
 "Copycat" 3:14
 "Watch" 2:57

Digital download / streaming – Sofi Tukker remix
 "Copycat" (Sofi Tukker remix) 3:18

Personnel
 Billie Eilish – vocals, songwriter
 Finneas O'Connell – songwriter, production
 John Greenham – mastering
 Rob Kinelski – mixing

Charts

Certifications

Release history

Notes

References

2017 singles
2017 songs
Billie Eilish songs
Songs written by Billie Eilish
Songs written by Finneas O'Connell
Song recordings produced by Finneas O'Connell
Electronica songs
Interscope Records singles